Fábio Manuel Matos dos Santos (born 22 May 1988) is a Portuguese professional footballer who plays as a central defender.

References

External links

1988 births
Living people
People from Viseu
Portuguese footballers
Association football defenders
Primeira Liga players
Liga Portugal 2 players
Segunda Divisão players
Académico de Viseu F.C. players
G.D. Tourizense players
Leixões S.C. players
C.S. Marítimo players
S.C. Beira-Mar players
G.D. Chaves players
Swiss Challenge League players
FC Wohlen players
Portuguese expatriate footballers
Expatriate footballers in Switzerland
Portuguese expatriate sportspeople in Switzerland
Sportspeople from Viseu District